Tangerine is a census-designated place (CDP) in Orange County, Florida, United States. The population was 2,865 at the 2010 census. It is part of the Orlando–Kissimmee Metropolitan Statistical Area.

Geography
Tangerine is located at  (28.758581, -81.631852).

Demographics

As of the census of 2000, there were 826 people, 323 households, and 256 families residing in the CDP. The racial makeup of the CDP was 91.65% White, 3.27% African American, 0.24% Native American, 1.57% Asian, 2.42% from other races, and 0.85% from two or more races. Hispanic or Latino of any race were 7.99% of the population.

There were 323 households, out of which 31.6% had children under the age of 18 living with them, 67.2% were married couples living together, 8.4% had a female householder with no husband present, and 20.7% were non-families. 16.1% of all the households were made up of individuals, and 5.3% had someone living alone who was 65 years of age or older.  The average household size was 2.56 and the average family size was 2.85.

In the CDP the population was spread out, with 23.2% under the age of 18, 4.7% from 18 to 24, 27.6% from 25 to 44, 29.8% from 45 to 64, and 14.6% who were 65 years of age or older.  The median age was 42 years. For every 100 females, there were 96.7 males.  For every 100 females age 18 and over, there were 91.5 males.

The median income for a household in the CDP was $42,264, and the median income for a family was $49,667. Males had a median income of $40,585 versus $22,045 for females. The per capita income for the CDP was $21,670.  About 2.8% of families and 2.7% of the population were below the poverty line, including 3.4% of those under age 18 and none of those age 65 or over.

History

Timeline

Mid 1870s 
Dudley W. Adams arrives at what is known as the "Olaville" settlement in Northwest Orange County, Florida.

1879 
During a neighborhood meeting at the home of Miss Bessie Heustis, sister-in-law of Mr. Adams, the name of Olaville is changed to Tangerine, the group being inspired by the fruit of the tree that grew by her doorstep.

1886-1887 
The Congregational Church is founded as the Union Church of Christ in Tangerine. Shortly thereafter, the name is changed to the Congregational Church of Christ and a church building is constructed. In the 1940s, the church is named Tangerine Community Church.

April 3, 1909 
The Tangerine Improvement Society (TIS) is founded by local Tangerine women.  Men are later admitted in 1920.

1911 
Mr. and Mrs. William H. and Addie G. Earl donate land to TIS for a community building – “Tangerine Community Hall.”

April 5, 1912 
The Tangerine Community Hall opens its doors to community use.

1920s 
Mrs. Sadie Trimble gifts Trimble Park, situated between Lakes Beauclaire and Carlton, to Orange County.

1937 
Land later to become Tangerine Park is conveyed to the Tangerine Improvement Society.

May 28, 1972 
The Tangerine Community Hall catches fire.  The nearby Zellwood, Florida fire department responds within seven minutes, but the building is destroyed.

April 18, 1977 
A new TIS building at 7101 Wright Ave. is dedicated as Johnston Hall in honor of Cecil “CeCe” Johnston for his dedication and service to Tangerine. When the original TIS building burned in 1972, Mr. Johnston led the drive for funds to erect the new building.

Notable residents  
Tangerine was the adopted home of novelist, journalist and government consultant Harry Hart Frank (born Chicago, Illinois, 1908; died Jacksonville, Florida, 1964). Under the pen name Pat Frank, his classic 1959 post-apocalyptic novel Alas, Babylon is set in the fictional Central Florida small town (stated pop. 3,500) of "Fort Repose". Fort Repose, although fictional, is a clearly drawn composite, representative of many small isolated native-settler Florida communities of the period.

In popular culture 
The setting for the popular young adult novel Tangerine by Edward Bloor is a fictional book based in Tangerine, Florida, located in the Orlando area and having no relation to the actual Tangerine, Florida.

Tangerine is indicated as the hiding place of former bank robber Doug MacRay in The Town.

References

External links
Tangerine, Florida at City-data.com

Census-designated places in Orange County, Florida
Greater Orlando